"V. Thirteen" is a song by English band Big Audio Dynamite, released as both a 7" and 12" single from their second studio album, No. 10, Upping St. (1986). "V. Thirteen" was one of 5 tracks that former Clash lyricist and lead vocalist Joe Strummer co-wrote with Mick Jones on the album who also co-produced the album, including this single, with Jones. Following the disappointing sales of "C'mon Every Beatbox", "V. Thirteen" was released as the second single from the album, charting slightly higher by peaking at No. 49 on the UK Singles Chart, and No. 15 on Billboard's Dance Club Songs.

Track listing
7" single
"V. Thirteen"
"Hollywood Boulevard (Remix)"
Remixed by Sam Sever

12" single
"V. Thirteen (Extended Remix)"
"Hollywood Boulevard (Club Mix)"
Remixed by Sam Sever
"Hollywood Boulevard (Dub Mix)"
Remixed by Sam Sever

Chart performance

"V. Thirteen" and "Hollywood Boulevard" charted together on the Billboard Hot Dance Club Play chart.

References

External links
 

1986 songs
1987 singles
Big Audio Dynamite songs
Songs written by Joe Strummer
Songs written by Mick Jones (The Clash)
Song recordings produced by Mick Jones (The Clash)
CBS Records singles